Neocollyris stiengensis is a species of ground beetle in the genus Neocollyris in the family Carabidae. It was described by Horn in 1914.

References

Stiengensis, Neocollyris
Beetles described in 1914